The Shadow Minister without Portfolio is a member of the Official Opposition Shadow Cabinet. The postholder shadows the Minister without portfolio.

The position was last held by Conor McGinn, Labour MP for St Helens North. He was appointed to the role in December 2021 by Keir Starmer, succeeding Ian Lavery, and served until September 2022.

List of Shadow Ministers without Portfolio 

* Incumbent's length of term last updated: .

References

Official Opposition (United Kingdom)
 
2011 establishments in the United Kingdom
2020 disestablishments in the United Kingdom